Reassembly may refer to:

Segmentation and Reassembly
Reassembly (video game)

See also
Digit-reassembly number